Jack Thomas Lazorko (born March 30, 1956) is an American former professional baseball pitcher. He played five seasons at the major league level for the Milwaukee Brewers, Seattle Mariners, Detroit Tigers and California Angels of Major League Baseball (MLB).

Career
Born in Hoboken, Lazorko grew up in River Edge, New Jersey. He attended Mississippi State University, and in 1976 he played collegiate summer baseball with the Cotuit Kettleers of the Cape Cod Baseball League. He was selected by the Houston Astros in the 11th round of the 1978 MLB Draft. Lazorko played his first professional season with their Rookie league Gulf Coast Astros and Class A-Advanced Daytona Beach Astros in 1978, and his last with the New York Mets' Triple-A Norfolk Tides in 1993. He played 20 seasons in national and international baseball, including the 1991 Scudetto in Parma, Italy, two years in Milan, Italy, and in the Florida Senior League until 1995.

Lazorko, a former amateur hockey goalie, is probably best known for a highlight reel of his fielding which was featured on This Week in Baseball for many years.  On the telecast of the New York Mets-Washington Nationals game of July 21, 2015, Ron Darling, himself a Gold Glove winner in the National League, called Lazorko "the best fielding pitcher" he had ever seen.  (Darling played against Lazorko in the Texas League in 1981.)

References

Sources
"Jack Lazorko Statistics". The Baseball Cube. 24 January 2008.
"Jack Lazorko Statistics". Baseball-Reference. 24 January 2008.

1956 births
Living people
American expatriate baseball players in Canada
American expatriate baseball players in Mexico
Asheville Tourists players
Baseball players from New Jersey
Calgary Cannons players
California Angels players
Cañeros de Los Mochis players
Cotuit Kettleers players
Denver Bears players
Daytona Beach Astros players
Detroit Tigers players
Edmonton Trappers players
El Paso Diablos players
Gulf Coast Astros players
Major League Baseball pitchers
Mexican League baseball pitchers
Milwaukee Brewers players
Mississippi State Bulldogs baseball players
Nashville Sounds players
Navegantes del Magallanes players
American expatriate baseball players in Venezuela
Norfolk Tides players
Phoenix Giants players
Seattle Mariners players
Sun City Rays players
Sportspeople from Hoboken, New Jersey
People from River Edge, New Jersey
Tulsa Drillers players
Tuneros de San Luis Potosí players
Vancouver Canadians players
Wichita Aeros players
Peninsula Oilers players